Miss Polonia 2018 was the 41st Miss Polonia pageant, held on 10 November 2018. The winner was Milena Sadowska of Lower Poland and she represented Poland in Miss World 2019 and Miss Grand International 2020. 1st Runner-Up Martyna Górak represented Poland at Miss Intercontinental 2019. 2nd Runner-Up Patrycja Woźniak presented the country at Miss Grand International 2019.

Final results

Special Awards

Official Delegates

Notes

Returns
Last competed in 2011:
 Polish Community in Lithuania

Last competed in 2012:
 Subcarpathia
 Upper Poland

Last competed in 2016:
 Kuyavia-Pomerania
 Lower Poland

Withdrawals
 Holy Cross
 Lower Silesia
 Lubusz
 West Pomerania

Did not compete
 Opole
 Podlasie
 Polish Community in Argentina
 Polish Community in Australia
 Polish Community in Belarus
 Polish Community in Brazil
 Polish Community in Canada
 Polish Community in France
 Polish Community in Germany
 Polish Community in Ireland
 Polish Community in Israel
 Polish Community in Russia
 Polish Community in South Africa
 Polish Community in Sweden
 Polish Community in the U.K.
 Polish Community in the U.S.
 Polish Community in Venezuela

References

External links
Official Website

2018
2018 beauty pageants
2018 in Poland